Lynne Ferrari Blankenbeker is an American politician and United States Navy captain.

Blankenbeker ran for the New Hampshire House of Representatives in 2008, but finished in seventh for the five positions. She ran in a special election for the New Hampshire House in 2009 after Tara Reardon resigned her seat, and won. She did not run for reelection in 2012 after she was recalled for duty in the U.S. Navy.

In the 2018 elections, Blankenbeker ran unsuccessfully for a seat in the U.S. House of Representatives for New Hampshire's 2nd congressional district. She is running again in the 2020 elections.
During the COVID-19 pandemic, she was deployed to the USNS Comfort.

References

External links

21st-century American naval officers
21st-century American politicians
21st-century American women politicians
United States Air Force personnel of the Gulf War
United States Navy personnel of the Iraq War
United States Navy personnel of the War in Afghanistan (2001–2021)
Female officers of the United States Air Force
Female United States Navy officers
Living people
Republican Party members of the New Hampshire House of Representatives
People from Lebanon, New Hampshire
People from Rome, New York
Politicians from Concord, New Hampshire
Troy University alumni
United States Air Force Nurse Corps officers
United States Navy Nurse Corps officers
United States Navy reservists
University of New Hampshire alumni
Women state legislators in New Hampshire
1964 births